Michael Foster (born 1947), known as Mike Foster, is an emeritus professor of English, and a Tolkien scholar. In 1978 he pioneered the teaching of Tolkien studies at university level.

Biography 

Michael Alan Foster was educated at Spalding High School. He obtained his first degree in Arts at Marquette University in 1968, and that year became a teacher at Spalding High School. He then took a Master's degree at Marquette. In 1971 he joined the staff of the English department of Illinois Central College in Peoria, Illinois, eventually becoming a professor there. In addition, he worked as a journalist for the Peoria Journal Star. 

He taught there until he retired in 2005. While at Illinois Central College he taught fantasy literature from 1974, and a special studies course focusing entirely on J. R. R. Tolkien from 1978. This represented what in the context of sceptical attitudes was "a rare success" in the early history of Tolkien research; Foster later documented his teaching approach on the course in "an appropriately anecdotal piece".
Foster has published many papers and book reviews on English fantasy literature, including on the Inklings Tolkien and his Oxford friend C. S. Lewis, as well as on J. M. Barrie and G. K. Chesterton.

Foster is a known Tolkien scholar; the Washington Post described him as "somewhat of an authority on all things Tolkien". In 1995 he became the North American representative of The Tolkien Society. He is on the Mythopoeic Society's Inklings scholarship committee.

References 

Tolkien studies

1947 births

Living people